Thyranthrene obliquizona is a moth of the family Sesiidae. It is known from Zambia.

References

Endemic fauna of Zambia
Sesiidae
Moths described in 1910